San Luis del Cordero is one of the 39 municipalities of Durango, in north-western Mexico. The municipal seat lies at San Luis del Cordero. The municipality covers an area of 543.9 km².

As of 2010, the municipality had a total population of 2,181, up from 2,013 as of 2005. 

As of 2010, the town of San Luis del Cordero had a population of 1,584. Other than the town of San Luis del Cordero, the municipality had 16 localities, none of which had a population over 1,000.

References

Municipalities of Durango